Lutz Wienhold (born 15 September 1965) is a German former professional footballer.

External links

1965 births
Living people
German footballers
East German footballers
East Germany under-21 international footballers
Chemnitzer FC players
DSV Leoben players
2. Bundesliga players
DDR-Oberliga players
Association football midfielders